Phreatobacter stygius is a Gram-negative, aerobic and motile bacterium from the genus of Phreatobacter.

References 

Hyphomicrobiales
Bacteria described in 2017